Trying to Never Catch Up is the first album by the Indie band What Made Milwaukee Famous, originally recorded in 2004 and re-recorded in 2006 with a changeup in the track list and a few new tunes for release on Barsuk Records.

Track listing
All songs by What Made Milwaukee Famous.
"Idecide" – 4:54
"Mercy, Me" – 3:07
"Hellodrama" – 2:51
"Selling Yourself Short" – 4:13
"The Jeopardy of Contentment" – 4:52
"Almost Always Never" – 4:09
"Hopelist" – 3:25
"Judas" – 3:17
"Trying to Never Catch Up" – 4:19
"Curtains!" – 4:26
"Sweet Lady" – 2:56
"Bldg. a Boat from the Boards in Your Eye" – 6:01

Personnel
 Michael Kingcaid – vocals, guitar, piano, organ, Rhodes, sequencer
 Drew Patrizi – keyboards, piano, organ, vocals, guitar, tambourine, sound effects
 John Houston Farmer – bass, vocals
 Josh Vernier - drums, percussion, vocals

References

What Made Milwaukee Famous (band) albums
2006 albums